The following is a list of 1994 Seattle Mariners draft picks. The Mariners took part in the June regular draft, also known as the Rule 4 draft. The Mariners made 75 selections in the 1994 draft, the first being catcher Jason Varitek in the first round. In all, the Mariners selected 29 pitchers, 24 outfielders, 10 catchers, 5 shortstops, 4 third basemen, and 3 first basemen.

Draft

Key

Table

References
General references

Inline citations

External links
Seattle Mariners official website